Labish Village is a census-designated place (CDP) in Marion County, Oregon, United States. The population was 454 at the 2020 census. It is part of the Salem Metropolitan Statistical Area.

Geography

Demographics

As of the census of 2000, there were 376 people, 93 households, and 77 families residing in the CDP. The population density was 6,712.1 people per square mile (2,419.6/km2). There were 101 housing units at an average density of 1,803.0/sq mi (649.9/km2). The racial makeup of the CDP was 51.06% White, 2.93% Native American, 0.27% Asian, 41.49% from other races, and 4.26% from two or more races. Hispanic or Latino of any race were 52.39% of the population.

There were 93 households, out of which 49.5% had children under the age of 18 living with them, 57.0% were married couples living together, 10.8% had a female householder with no husband present, and 17.2% were non-families. 12.9% of all households were made up of individuals, and 4.3% had someone living alone who was 65 years of age or older. The average household size was 4.04 and the average family size was 4.13.

In the CDP, the population was spread out, with 36.7% under the age of 18, 14.4% from 18 to 24, 29.8% from 25 to 44, 14.9% from 45 to 64, and 4.3% who were 65 years of age or older. The median age was 24 years. For every 100 females, there were 111.2 males. For every 100 females age 18 and over, there were 138.0 males.

The median income for a household in the CDP was $29,345, and the median income for a family was $28,750. Males had a median income of $17,000 versus $20,000 for females. The per capita income for the CDP was $8,789. About 12.9% of families and 10.5% of the population were below the poverty line, including 12.4% of those under age 18 and none of those age 65 or over.

References

Census-designated places in Oregon
Salem, Oregon metropolitan area
Unincorporated communities in Marion County, Oregon
Census-designated places in Marion County, Oregon
Unincorporated communities in Oregon